Elophila gyralis, the waterlily borer moth, is a moth in the family Crambidae. It was described by George Duryea Hulst in 1886. It is found in eastern North America, where it has been recorded from Alabama, Florida, Georgia, Illinois, Indiana, Iowa, Louisiana, Maine, Maryland, Massachusetts, Michigan, Minnesota, Mississippi, New Brunswick, New Hampshire, New Jersey, New York, North Carolina, Nova Scotia, Ohio, Oklahoma, Ontario, Pennsylvania, Quebec, South Carolina, Tennessee, Texas and Wisconsin.

The wingspan is 16–30 mm. Adults are sexually dimorphic. Females mostly have uniform orangish-yellow to dark brown forewings, while those of the males are orangish brown to dark grayish brown. The hindwings range from whitish to gray. Adults have been recorded on wing year round in the southern part of the range.

The larvae feed on the leaves of waterlilies, boring into petioles.

Subspecies
Elophila gyralis gyralis
Elophila gyralis serralinealis (Barnes & Benjamin, 1924)

References

Acentropinae
Moths described in 1886
Moths of North America
Aquatic insects